The governor of Florida is the head of government of the U.S. state of Florida and the commander-in-chief of the state's military forces. The governor has a duty to enforce state laws and the power to either approve or veto bills passed by the Florida Legislature, to convene the legislature and grant pardons, except in cases of impeachment.

When Florida was first acquired by the United States, future president Andrew Jackson served as its military governor. Florida Territory was established in 1822 and five people served as governor over 6 distinct terms. The first territorial governor, William Pope Duval, served 12 years, the longest of any Florida governor to date.

Since statehood in 1845, there have been 45 people who have served as governor, one of whom served two distinct terms. Four state governors have served two full four-year terms: William D. Bloxham, in two stints, as well as Reubin Askew, Jeb Bush and Rick Scott who each served their terms consecutively. Bob Graham almost served two full terms but resigned with three days left in his term in order to take a seat in the United States Senate. The shortest term in office belongs to Wayne Mixson, who served three days following the resignation of his predecessor, Bob Graham.

The current officeholder is Ron DeSantis, a member of the Republican Party who took office on January 8, 2019.

Governors

Federal military commissioner

Spanish Florida was acquired from Spain in the Adams–Onís Treaty, which took effect July 10, 1821. Parts of West Florida had already been assigned to Alabama, Louisiana, and Mississippi; the remainder and East Florida were governed by a military commissioner with the powers of governor until the territory was organized and incorporated.

Governors of the Territory of Florida
Florida Territory was organized on March 30, 1822, combining East and West Florida.

Governors of the State of Florida
The State of Florida was admitted to the Union on March 3, 1845. It seceded from the Union on January 10, 1861, and joined the Confederate States of America on February 8, 1861, as a founding member. Following the end of the American Civil War, it was part of the Third Military District. Florida was readmitted to the Union on June 25, 1868.

The Florida Constitution of 1838 provided that a governor be elected every 4 years, who was not allowed to serve consecutive terms. The secessionist constitution of 1861 would have reduced this to two years and removed the term limit, but the state fell to the Union before the first election under that constitution. The rejected constitution of 1865 and the ratified constitution of 1868 maintained the four-year term, though without the earlier term limit, which was reintroduced in the 1885 constitution. The current constitution of 1968 states that should the governor serve, or would have served had he not resigned, more than six years in two consecutive terms, he cannot be elected to the succeeding term. The start of a term was set in 1885 at the first Tuesday after the first Monday in the January following the election, where it has remained.

Originally, the president of the state senate acted as governor should that office be vacant. The 1865 and 1868 constitutions created the office of lieutenant governor, who would similarly act as governor. This office was abolished in 1885, with the president of the senate again taking on that duty. The 1968 constitution recreated the office of lieutenant governor, who now becomes governor in the absence of the governor. The governor and lieutenant governor are elected on the same ticket.

Florida was a strongly Democratic state before the Civil War, electing only one candidate from the Whig Party (the Democrats' chief opposition at the time). It elected three Republican governors following Reconstruction, but after the Democratic Party re-established control, 90 years passed before voters chose another Republican.

Acting governor
Florida has had a number of people serve as acting governor. The state's first three constitutions provided that the succession in office became operative whenever the governor was out of the state. Thus, in 1853 when Governor Thomas Brown attended an event in Boston—the Senate president who would normally succeed the governor at the time was also out of state. Therefore, the Speaker of the Florida House of Representatives, A.K. Allison, became acting governor on September 16, 1853. He served for 17 days.

Article IV Section 3 (b) of the Florida Constitution now calls for the lieutenant governor to "act as Governor" during the governor's physical or mental incapacity. This provision has been invoked one time.  On June 18, 2008, Governor Charlie Crist filed a proclamation with the secretary of state transferring power of governor to Lt. Governor Jeff Kottkamp pursuant to the constitutional provision while he underwent knee surgery.

See also
 Gubernatorial lines of succession in the United States#Florida
 List of Florida state legislatures

Notes

References
General

 
 
 
 
 

Constitutions

 
 
 
 
 
 

Specific

Florida
List
Lists of Florida politicians